Karl Edward Burgreen (October 16, 1911 – November 12, 1988), also known as Edward Burgreen, was an American politician who served in the Alabama House of Representatives from 1966 to 1970.

Life
Burgreen was born on October 16, 1911, in Limestone County, Alabama to Karl Roland Burgreen and Lizzie Etta Stewart. On December 19, 1935, he married Mary Catherine Johnson. They had 3 children, 2 girls and 1 boy. In 1944, he served as a member of the Limestone County Board of Revenue, where he would stay for 4 years.

He died on November 12, 1988, at the age of 77. His son, William Karl Burgreen died on January 6, 1998.

References

1911 births
1988 deaths
Democratic Party members of the Alabama House of Representatives
20th-century American politicians
People from Limestone County, Alabama